"Memories & Dust" is a song by Australian singer-songwriter Josh Pyke. It was released in October 2006 as the lead single from Pyke's debut studio album, Memories & Dust (2007). The song peaked at number 39 on the ARIA Charts.

Track list

Charts

References

2006 singles
2006 songs
Josh Pyke songs